Dikran Chögürian (Տիգրան Չէօկիւրեան, 1884, Gümüşhane, Ottoman Empire – 1915) was an ethnic Armenian writer and teacher, editor of the journal Vostan (Ոստան) and a victim of the Armenian genocide.

Life

He graduated from the Berberian College of Constantinople (now Istanbul) in 1907 and then worked as a teacher in Armenian schools. Chogurian became known in 1910 with the publication of a collection of short stories entitled Voices from the Homeland (Հայրենի Ձայներ). In 1914 he published his most important work, the novel The Monastery (Վանքը), dedicated to the power and victory of civilization and freedom. He was arrested and killed in 1915 among a number of Armenian intellectuals.

Sources
"Armenian Question", encyclopedia, ed. by acad. K. Khudaverdyan, Yerevan, 1996, p. 373

External links
Biography 

1884 births
1915 deaths
People from Gümüşhane
Armenians from the Ottoman Empire
20th-century Armenian writers
People who died in the Armenian genocide
Ethnic Armenian painters
20th-century writers from the Ottoman Empire
20th-century Armenian painters
Berberian School alumni